In the Kindu rail accident on November 29, 2005, at least 60 people were killed on the Vicicongo line when they were swept off the roof of a train into the river below as the train crossed a bridge in the eastern Democratic Republic of Congo. After speaking with local officials in his region, Koloso Sumaili, the governor of Maniema province, says it seemed there were over 60 dead in this accident. "Trains that travel on that line have lots of people and goods on the roof. When the train was crossing over a bridge, the beams supporting the bridge swept people and goods off the train and into the river below," he said.

See also
 List of rail accidents (2000–present)

2005 disasters in the Democratic Republic of the Congo
Railway accidents in 2005
Railway accidents and incidents in the Democratic Republic of the Congo
Bridge disasters in the Democratic Republic of the Congo
Bridge disasters caused by overloading
Maniema
2005 in the Democratic Republic of the Congo